The 2008–09 Ivy League men's basketball season was the Ivy League's 55th season of basketball. Cornell University won the league title for the second year in a row and was the recipient of the Ivy League's automatic bid to the 2009 NCAA Division I men's basketball tournament. Alex Barnett of Dartmouth College was the Ivy League Men's Basketball Player of the Year.

During the 2008–09 season, Harvard's Jeremy Lin was the only NCAA Division I men's college basketball player who ranked in the top ten in his conference for scoring (17.8), rebounding (5.5), assists (4.3), steals (2.4), blocked shots (0.6), field goal percentage (0.502), free throw percentage (0.744), and 3 point shot percentage (0.400).

Results

NCAA tournament

See also
Ivy League

Notes